Kathmore is an unincorporated place and former railway point in geographic Master Township in the Unorganized South Part of Nipissing District in northeastern Ontario, Canada.

The railway point lies on the now abandoned Canadian National Railway Beachburg Subdivision, a section of track that was originally constructed as the Canadian Northern Railway main line, between Achray to the west and Dahlia to the east.

References

Other map sources:

Communities in Nipissing District